New Oxford High School is a midsized public high school located in the borough of New Oxford, Pennsylvania. The school is the sole high school in the Conewago Valley School District. New Oxford High School serves students from a portion of eastern Adams County. In 2016, enrollment at New Oxford High School was reported as 1,208 pupils in 9th through 12th grades, with 34% of pupils eligible for a free lunch due to the family meeting the federal poverty level. Additionally, 13% of pupils received special education services, while 4% of pupils were identified as gifted. The school employed 75 teachers. In 2014, enrollment was reported as 1,244 pupils in 9th through 12th grades, with 32.8% of pupils eligible for a free lunch due to family poverty. Additionally, 14% of pupils received special education services, while 3% of pupils were identified as gifted. The school employed 76 teachers. Per the Pennsylvania Department of Education, 4% of the teachers were rated "Non-Highly Qualified" under the federal No Child Left Behind Act.

According to the National Center for Education Statistics, in 2010, New Oxford High School reported an enrollment of 1,281 pupils in grades 9th through 12th.

Extracurriculars
New Oxford High School offers a wide variety of clubs, activities and an extensive sports program.

Sports
The district funds:

Boys
Baseball - AAAAA
Basketball- AAAAA
Cross Country - AAA
Football - AAAAA
Golf - AAA
Indoor Track and Field - AAAA
Lacrosse - AA
Soccer - AAAA
Swimming and Diving - AAA
Tennis - AAA
Track and Field - AAA
Volleyball - AAA
Wrestling - AAA

Girls
Basketball - AAAAA
Cheer - AAAAAA
Cross Country - AAA
Field Hockey - AA
Golf - AAA
Indoor Track and Field - AAAA
Lacrosse - AAA
Soccer (Fall) - AAAA
Softball - AAAAA
Swimming and Diving - AAA
Girls' Tennis - AAA
Track and Field - AAA
Volleyball - AAAA

The high school's sports program is fed by an extensive middle school program.
Middle School Sports

Boys
Basketball
Cross Country
Football
Soccer
Track and Field
Wrestling	

Girls
Basketball
Cheer
Cross Country
Field Hockey
Soccer
Track and Field
Volleyball

According to PIAA directory July 2016

See also
High schools in Pennsylvania

References

Public high schools in Pennsylvania
Schools in Adams County, Pennsylvania